The 2023 Oceania Badminton Championships was a continental badminton championships in Oceania sanctioned by the Badminton Oceania, and Badminton World Federation. The individual and mixed team events were held from 13 to 16 and 17 to 19 February 2023, respectively.

Venue 
The tournament was held at the Auckland Badminton Stadium, Auckland, New Zealand.

Medal summary

Medalists

Medal table

Men's singles

Seeds 

 Nathan Tang (Quarter-finals)
 Edward Lau (Final)
 Adam Dolman (Third round)
 Jacob Schueler (Semi-finals)
 Abhinav Manota (Champion)
 Ricky Cheng (Third round)
 Athi Selladurai (Third round)
 Pit Seng Low (Third round)

Finals

Top half

Section 1

Section 2

Bottom half

Section 3

Section 4

Women's singles

Seeds 

 Tiffany Ho (Final) 
 Louisa Ma (Semi-finals)
 Bernice Teoh (Semi-finals)
 Sydney Go (Quarter-finals)

Finals

Top half

Section 1

Section 2

Top half

Section 3

Section 4

Men's doubles

Seeds 

 Adam Jeffrey / Dylan Soedjasa (Second round)
 Abhinav Manota / Jack Wang (Second round)
 Jonathan Curtin / Ryan Tong (Second round)
 Julian Lee / Milain Lohith Ranasinghe (Quarter-finals)

Finals

Top half

Section 1

Section 2

Bottom half

Section 3

Section 4

Women's doubles

Seeds 

 Erena Calder-Hawkins / Anona Pak (Second round)
 Tiffany Ho / Khoo Lee Yen (Final)
 Kaitlyn Ea / Angela Yu (Quarter-finals)
 Carina Sam / Priska Kustiadi (Semi-finals)

Finals

Top half

Section 1

Section 2

Bottom half

Section 3

Section 4

Mixed doubles

Seeds 

 Kenneth Choo / Gronya Somerville  (Champions)
 Adam Jeffrey / Justine Villegas (First round)
 Jack Wang / Erena Calder-Hawkins (First round)
 Dylan Soedjasa / Anona Pak (First round)

Finals

Top half

Section 1

Section 2

Bottom half

Section 3

Section 4

Team event

Standings

Tahiti vs Cook Islands

New Zealand vs Tonga

Australia vs Northern Mariana Islands

New Caledonia vs Northern Mariana Islands

New Zealand vs Cook Islands

Australia vs Tonga

Australia vs Cook Islands

New Caledonia vs Tonga

Tahiti vs Northern Mariana Islands

Australia vs Tahiti

New Caledonia vs Cook Islands

New Zealand vs Northern Mariana Islands

Tonga vs Northern Mariana Islands

New Zealand vs Tahiti

Australia vs New Caledonia

Cook Islands vs Northern Mariana Islands

Tahiti vs Tonga

New Zealand vs New Caledonia

Australia vs New Zealand

Tahiti vs New Caledonia

Cook Islands vs Tonga

References

External links 
Official website
Individual tournament link
Team tournament link

Oceania Badminton Championships
Oceania Badminton Championships
International sports competitions hosted by New Zealand
Badminton tournaments in New Zealand
Oceania Badminton Championships